Na Ư is a commune (xã) and village of the Điện Biên District of Điện Biên Province, northwestern Vietnam. It is located 24 kilometres from the border with Laos.

Communes of Điện Biên province
Populated places in Điện Biên province